Charismatic authority is a concept of leadership developed by the German sociologist Max Weber. It involves a type of organization or a type of leadership in which authority derives from the charisma of the leader. This stands in contrast to two other types of authority: legal authority and traditional authority. Each of the three types forms part of Max Weber's tripartite classification of authority.

"Charisma" is an ancient Greek term that initially gained prominence through Saint Paul's letters to the emerging Christian communities in the first century. In this context, it generally referred to a divinely-originating "gift" that demonstrated the authority of God within the early leaders of the Church. Max Weber took this theological notion and generalized it, viewing it as something that followers attribute, thereby opening it up for use by sociologists who applied it to political, military, celebrity, and non-Christian religious contexts.  Other terms used are "charismatic domination" and "charismatic leadership".

Characteristics

Charisma
Weber applies the term charisma to
This definition, however, does not get to the crux of what charisma is, making the concept as defined by Weber unscientific and impossible to measure or to manipulate . In the modern era, psychologists have defined charisma in terms of its outcomes (i.e., charismatic leaders are highly effective). Whether from a Weberian or psychological conceptualization, it is problematic to not define a construct scientifically . This issue of conceptualization is important to consider else the concept and how it relates to outcomes is circular in reasoning. The conclusions derived from the theory cannot be refuted given that the proponents claim something akin to if effective, therefore charismatic. Charisma, however, can be studied scientifically if seen as a costly signal, using values, symbols, and emotions. Its economic value in consequential settings has also been scientifically examined. Thus Weber's insights were valuable in identifying the construct of charisma. Modern social science therefore still supports the original thinking regarding the utility of the construct.

Authority
Weber interchanges authority and dominance[H]as been considered in sociological terms as indicating the legitimate or socially approved use of power. It is the legitimate power which one person or a group holds and exercises over another. The element of legitimacy is vital to the notion of authority and is the main means by which authority is distinguished from the more general concept of power. Power can be exerted by the use of force or violence. Authority, by contrast, depends on the acceptance by subordinates of the right of those above them to give them orders or directives.
Charismatic authority is often the most lasting of regimes because the leader is seen as infallible and any action against him will be seen as a crime against the state. Charismatic leaders eventually develop a cult of personality often not by their own doing.

Leadership is the power to diffuse a positive energy and a sense of greatness. As such, it rests almost entirely on the leader. The absence of that leader for any reason can lead to the authority's power dissolving. However, due to its idiosyncratic nature and lack of formal organization, charismatic authority depends much more strongly on the perceived legitimacy of the authority than Weber's other forms of authority. For instance, a charismatic leader in a religious context might require an unchallenged belief that the leader has been touched by God, in the sense of a prophet. Should the strength of this belief fade, the power of the charismatic leader can fade quickly, which is one of the ways in which this form of authority shows itself to be unstable.

In contrast to the current popular use of the term charismatic leader, Weber saw charismatic authority not so much as character traits of the charismatic leader but as a relationship between the leader and his followers. The validity of charisma is founded on its "recognition" by the leader's followers (or "adepts" – Anhänger).
His charisma risks disappearing if he is "abandoned by God" or if "his government doesn't provide any prosperity to those whom he dominates".

Routinizing charisma 
Charismatic authority almost always endangers the boundaries set by traditional (coercive) or rational (legal) authority. It tends to challenge this authority, and is thus often seen as revolutionary. Usually this charismatic authority is incorporated into society. Hereby the challenge that it presents to society will subside. The way in which this happens is called routinization.

By routinization,  the charismatic authority changes:

A religion which evolves its own priesthood and establishes a set of laws and rules is likely to lose its charismatic character and move towards another type of authority. For example, Muhammad, who had charismatic authority as "The Prophet" among his followers, was succeeded by the traditional authority and structure of Islam, a clear example of routinization.

In politics, charismatic rule is often found in various authoritarian states, autocracies, dictatorships and theocracies. To help to maintain their charismatic authority, such regimes will often establish a vast personality cult. When the leader of such a state dies or leaves office, and a new charismatic leader does not appear, such a regime is likely to fall shortly thereafter, unless it has become fully routinized.

Charismatic succession
Because the authority is concentrated in one leader, the death of the charismatic leader would constitute the destruction of the government unless prior arrangements were made. A society that faces the end of their charismatic leader can choose to move to another format of leadership or to have a transference of charismatic authority to another leader by means of succession.

According to Max Weber, the methods of succession are: search, revelation, designation by original leader, designation by qualified staff, hereditary charisma, and office charisma. These are the various ways in which an individual and a society can contrive to maintain the unique energy and nature of charisma in their leadership.

Search
"The search for a new charismatic leader (takes place) on the basis of the qualities which will fit him for the position of authority." An example of this search method is the search for a new Dalai Lama. "It consists in a search for a child with characteristics which are interpreted to mean that he is a reincarnation of the Buddha." This search is an example of the way in which an original charismatic leader can be forced to "live on" through a replacement.

Revelation
"In this case the legitimacy of the new leader is dependent on the legitimacy of the technique of selection." The technique of selection is the modus operandi of the selection process. In ancient times, oracles were believed to have special access to "divine judgment" and thus their technique in selection was perceived to be legitimate. Their choice was imbued with the charismatic authority that came with the oracle's endorsement.

Designation by original leader
In this form, the original holder of charismatic authority is perceived to have passed their authority to another. An example is Joseph Stalin's claim that Vladimir Lenin had designated him to be his successor as leader of the USSR. Insofar as people believed in this claim, Stalin gained Lenin's charismatic authority.

Designated by qualified staff
"A successor (may be designated) by the charismatically qualified administrative staff... (T)his process should not be interpreted as 'election' or 'nomination'... It is not determined by merely a majority vote...Unanimity (is) often required." A case example of this form of succession is the papal conclave of cardinals to choose a new pope. The cardinals taking part in the papal conclave are viewed to be charismatically qualified by their Roman Catholic congregations and thus their choice is imbued with charismatic authority.

Hereditary charisma
Charisma can be perceived as "a quality transmitted by heredity". This method of succession is present in Kim Il-sung's charisma being passed on to his son, Kim Jong Il. This type of succession is a difficult undertaking and often results in a movement toward traditionalization and legalization in authority.

Office charisma
"The concept of charisma may be transmitted by ritual means from one bearer to another...It involves a dissociation of charisma from a particular individual, making it an objective, transferable entity." Priestly consecration is believed to be a modus through which priestly charisma to teach and perform other priestly duties is transferred to a person. In this way, priests inherit priestly charisma and are subsequently perceived by their congregations as having the charismatic authority that comes with the priesthood.

Application of Weber's theories
Weber's model of charismatic leadership giving way to institutionalization is endorsed by several academic sociologists.

New religious movements
Eileen Barker discusses the tendency for new religious movements to have founders or leaders who wield considerable charismatic authority and are believed to have special powers or knowledge.  Charismatic leaders are unpredictable, Barker says, for they are not bound by tradition or rules and they may be accorded by their followers the right to pronounce on all aspects of their lives. Barker warns that in these cases the leader may lack any accountability, require unquestioning obedience, and encourage a dependency upon the movement for material, spiritual and social resources.

George D. Chryssides asserts that not all new religious movements have charismatic leaders, and that there are differences in the hegemonic styles among those movements that do.

Narcissism
Len Oakes, an Australian psychologist who wrote a dissertation about charisma, had eleven charismatic leaders fill in a psychometric test, which he called the adjective checklist, and found them as a group quite ordinary. Following the psychoanalyst Heinz Kohut, Oakes argues that charismatic leaders exhibit traits of narcissism and also argues that they display an extraordinary amount of energy, accompanied by an inner clarity unhindered by the anxieties and guilt that afflict more ordinary people. He did however not fully follow Weber's framework of charismatic authority.

Comparison table

See also

 Authentic leadership
 Caudillo
 Demagogue
 Führerprinzip
 Great man theory
 Monarch
 Power (social and political)
 Tripartite classification of authority
 The Three Types of Legitimate Rule

References
Informational notes

Citations

Bibliography
 
 
 
 
 
 Waters, Tony and Dagmar Waters (2015) editors and translators.  Weber's Rationalism and Modern Society: New Translations on Politics, Bureaucracy, and Social Stratification.  New York: Palsgrave Macmillan.

External links
 Let's face it: Charisma matters from TEDx
 Charisma by Thomas Robbin in the Encyclopedia of Religion and Society edited by William H. Swatos (February 1998) 
 Charismatic Authority: Emotional Bonds Between Leaders and Followers
 Weber links
 Article: "Moses, Charisma, and Covenant"

Max Weber
Authority